Gorski Izvor is a village in the municipality of Dimitrovgrad, in Haskovo Province, in southern Bulgaria.

Etymology 

Gorski Izvor (Bulgarian: Горски Извор) means Forest Spring in Bulgarian. The name is derived from the abundance of trees in the local area, along with where the village is situated - on a mountain - which grants it access to spring water.

References
2. Google Translate - alternative translation offers correct context (forest spring) as opposed to forest source.

Villages in Haskovo Province